Setback may refer to:

 Setback (architecture), making upper storeys of a high-rise building further back than the lower ones for aesthetic, structural, or land-use restriction reasons
 Setback (land use), a dimensional standard commonly addressed under land use regulations, which define the required distances that a building, structure, or land use may exist from a boundary or natural feature (e.g. wetlands, flood plains, etc).
 Pitch (card game), a card game related to All Fours
A problem
 Setback arming, a safety-arming mechanism used on some munition fuzes
Setbacks (album)